Squash at the 2005 Southeast Asian Games took place in the Makati Sports Club in Makati, Metro Manila, Philippines.

The event was held from November 29 to December 1.

Squash is an indoor racquet sport which was, until recently, called "Squash Rackets", a reference to the 'squashable' soft ball used in the game (compared with the harder ball used in its parent game Racquets or Rackets).

The game is played by two players, with 'standard' rackets (or occasionally four players for doubles) in a four-walled court with a small, hollow rubber ball.

Medal table

Medalists

External links
Southeast Asian Games Official Results.

2005 Southeast Asian Games events
Southeast Asian Games
2005